The 1910 North Down by-election was held on 28 April 1910.  The by-election was held due to the death of the incumbent Irish Unionist MP, Thomas Corbett.  It was won by the Irish Unionist candidate William Mitchell-Thomson, who was unopposed.

External links 
A Vision Of Britain Through Time

References

1910 elections in Ireland
1910 elections in the United Kingdom
By-elections to the Parliament of the United Kingdom in County Down constituencies
Unopposed by-elections to the Parliament of the United Kingdom in Irish constituencies
20th century in County Down